They Always Return at Dawn (Spanish: Siempre vuelven de madrugada) is a 1949 Spanish drama film directed by Jerónimo Mihura.

Cast
 Mercedes Albert as Elvira  
 Margarita Andrey as Susana  
 Manuel Arbó as Comisario Suárez  
 Rafael Bardem as Don Carlos 
 Francisco Bernal as Barman  
 Rafael Cortés 
 Félix Fernandez as Don José  
 José Franco as El hombre  
 Casimiro Hurtado
 Rufino Inglés as Paco  
 José Isbert as Don Jacobo  
 María Martín as Mary  
 Arturo Marín as Don Ramón 
 Matilde Muñoz Sampedro as Maruja  
 Miguel Pastor as Manolo  
 Julio Peña as Luis 
 Antonia Planas as Doña Pilar  
 Conrado San Martín as Andrés  
 Asunción Sancho as Cecilia  
 Pilar Sirvent as Chica del tiro al blanco 
 María Luisa Solé

References

Bibliography
 Bentley, Bernard. A Companion to Spanish Cinema. Boydell & Brewer 2008.

External links 

1949 films
1949 drama films
Spanish drama films
1940s Spanish-language films
Films directed by Jerónimo Mihura
Spanish black-and-white films
1940s Spanish films